Anthony Keck (1726–1797) was an 18th-century English architect with an extensive practice in Gloucestershire, Worcestershire, Herefordshire and South Wales.

Life
Keck was born at Randwick, Gloucestershire in 1726 He designed in the "austere Neoclassical style of the late eighteenth century – a provincial follower of Robert Adam."

He died at Kings Stanley, Gloucestershire, the village where he had his workshop and studio for most of his life, on 4 October 1797 at the age of seventy.  He died at Beech House in the village, the home he partly designed for himself, and is buried in St. George's Church.

Works
Keck is credited with designing some fifty country houses in the South-West of England and South Wales.  His works include:
 Longworth Hall, Herefordshire
 Barnsley Park, Cirencester, Gloucestershire
 Burghill Court, Herefordshire
 Flaxley Abbey, Forest of Dean, Gloucestershire
 Forthampton Court, Gloucestershire
 Ham Court, Upton-upon-Severn, Gloucestershire, demolished 1926
 Highgrove House, Tetbury, Gloucestershire
 Iscoed, Carmarthenshire
 Margam Park, Glamorgan
 Moccas Court, Herefordshire
 Newton Court, Dixton, Monmouthshire
 Penrice Castle, Glamorgan
 Slebech Park, Pembrokeshire
 Stratford Park, Stroud, Gloucestershire
 Whitfield House, Wormbridge, Herefordshire
 Wormington Grange, Tewkesbury, Gloucestershire
 Underdown, Ledbury, Herefordshire

Keck's work was not confined to country houses, including churches, such as Old St. Martin's, Worcestershire and St. Peter and St. Paul's, Upton-Upon-Severn, including its famed lantern and cupola; public buildings, such as the Worcester Royal Infirmary and contributions to the Stroudwater canal.

Notes

Gallery of architectural work

18th-century English architects
Greek Revival architects
1726 births
1797 deaths
People from Stroud District
Architects from Gloucestershire